The Juchipila Formation is a geologic formation in Mexico. It preserves fossils dating back to the Neogene period.<ref name="carranzacastanedaetal2013"/ Closely corresponding to the other Hemphillian faunal assemblages of North America, it is significant for understanding the palaeofauna of Miocene and Pliocene central Mexico.

Paleoenvironment 
The paleoenvironment of the Juchipila Formation was largely terrestrial in nature. The El Mixton locality consists of a shallow lacustrine succession, beginning near the bottom of an arroyo. Ostracods and gastropods are abundant in these deposits. A thin bed of unconsolidated white ash-fall material, consisting of felsic glass shards and small, overlies the shallow lacustrine succession of the El Mixton locality. In this part of the succession, camelid and proboscidian footprints are known. The loose paleosols of the El Mixton contain mammal fossils, including the canid Borophagus and the equid Dinohippus. The terrestrial Puente de Cofradía locality bears fossils of Calippus and Cosoryx. The volcaniclastic sandstone of the El Resbalón bears indeterminate megalonychids and antilocaprids.

Paleobiota 
The Juchipila Formation has yielded a rich variety of extinct mammals.

Mammals

See also 

 List of fossiliferous stratigraphic units in Mexico

References

External links 
 

Geologic formations of Mexico
Neogene Mexico